Lopezia is a genus of plants of the family Onagraceae, largely restricted to Mexico and Central America.

Description 
Herbs or shrubs, mostly freely branched. Leaves petioled, alternate, or the lower opposite, simple. Flowers -solitary, small, pedicelled, in upper axils of sometimes much reduced leaves. Floral tube inconspicuous. Sepals 4, mostly red, narrow. Petals 4, dissimilar, white to rose, the 2 upper unguiculate, with none, one, or two glands at apex of claw; the 2 lower clawed and curved upward, glandless. Stamens 2, adnate to the style and connate with each other at the base, the posterior fertile, the anterior sterile, petaloid. Ovary 4-loculed; style short, filiform, with slightly enlarged and barely lobed stigma; ovules multiseriate, many. Capsule globose to clavate, coriaceous, 4-loculed and -valved. Seeds many, obovoid, granulate.

Taxonomy
The genus name of Lopezia is in honour of Manuel López-Figueiras (1915-2012), who was a (Spanish-) Venezuelan botanist (Mycology and Lichenology), from the University of Havana (in Cuba).

Distribution 
It is found in Costa Rica, El Salvador, Guatemala, Honduras, Mexico and Panamá.

Species
According to Kew, there are 28 species are recognized in the genus Lopezia in 2022:
 Lopezia ciliatula Plitmann, P.H.Raven & Breedlove
 Lopezia clavata Brandegee
 Lopezia concinna P.H. Raven
 Lopezia conjugans Brandegee
 Lopezia cornuta S. Watson
 Lopezia coronata Andrews
 Lopezia galeottii Planch.
 Lopezia gentryi (Munz) Plitmann, P.H. Raven & Breedlove
 Lopezia gracilis S. Watson
 Lopezia grandiflora Zucc.
 Lopezia hirsuta Jacq.
 Lopezia integrifolia DC.
 Lopezia laciniata (Rose) M.E. Jones
 Lopezia langmaniae Miranda. The species name langmaniae was given in honor of Ida Kaplan Langman.
 Lopezia longiflora Decne.
 Lopezia lopezioides (Hook. & Arn.) Plitmann, P.H. Raven & Breedlove
 Lopezia miniata Lag. ex DC.
 Lopezia miniata subsp. paniculata (Seem.) Plitmann, P.H. Raven & Breedlove
 Lopezia oaxacana Rose
 Lopezia ovata (Plitmann, P.H. Raven & Breedlove) Plitmann
 Lopezia pringlei Rose
 Lopezia racemosa Cav.
 Lopezia riesenbachia Plitmann, P.H. Raven & Breedlove
 Lopezia semeiandra Plitmann, P.H. Raven & Breedlove
 Lopezia sinaloensis Munz
 Lopezia smithii Rose
 Lopezia suffrutescens Munz
 Lopezia trichota Schltdl.
 Lopezia violacea Rose

Gallery

Notes

References

Onagraceae
Onagraceae genera
Flora of Mexico
Flora of Central America
Taxa named by Antonio José Cavanilles